Ambrogio Morelli (4 September 1905, in Nerviano – 10 October 2000, in Nerviano) was an Italian professional road bicycle racer.

Major results

1929
Tre Valli Varesine
Giro d'Italia:
10th place overall classification
1930
Giro del Piemonte
Giro dell'Umbria
Giro d'Italia:
4th place overall classification
1931
Giro d'Italia:
8th place overall classification
Winner stage 12
1934
Tour de France:
6th place overall classification
1935
Tour de France:
2nd place overall classification
Winner stages 16 and 20B
Giro d'Italia:
10th place overall classification
1936
Giro d'Italia:
7th place overall classification
1937
Giro d'Italia:
9th place overall classification

External links 

Official Tour de France results for Ambrogio Morelli

Italian male cyclists
1905 births
2000 deaths
Italian Tour de France stage winners
Cyclists from the Metropolitan City of Milan